Carboxydothermus ferrireducens is a thermophilic and anaerobic bacterium from the genus of Carboxydothermus.

References

 

Peptococcaceae
Bacteria described in 1997
Thermophiles